Desmidophorus is a genus of weevils in the family Brachyceridae.

Species
The genus includes the following species:

 Desmidophorus aeneobarbus
 Desmidophorus aequalis
 Desmidophorus alboniger
 Desmidophorus anxius
 Desmidophorus apicatus
 Desmidophorus areolatus
 Desmidophorus aterrimus
 Desmidophorus aureolus
 Desmidophorus bickhardti
 Desmidophorus brachmanum
 Desmidophorus breviusculus
 Desmidophorus brunneopilosus
 Desmidophorus caelatus
 Desmidophorus centralis
 Desmidophorus cineritius
 Desmidophorus communicans
 Desmidophorus confucii
 Desmidophorus crassus
 Desmidophorus cumingi
 Desmidophorus descarpentriesi
 Desmidophorus diffusus
 Desmidophorus discriminans
 Desmidophorus dohrni
 Desmidophorus dorsatus
 Desmidophorus duodecimfasciculatus
 Desmidophorus elongatus
 Desmidophorus encaustus
 Desmidophorus excellens
 Desmidophorus fasciatus
 Desmidophorus fasciculaticollis
 Desmidophorus fasciculicollis
 Desmidophorus fausti
 Desmidophorus floccosus
 Desmidophorus fulvidus
 Desmidophorus fulvopilosus
 Desmidophorus funebris
 Desmidophorus galericulus
 Desmidophorus granulipennis
 Desmidophorus griseipes
 Desmidophorus grisescens
 Desmidophorus hartmannianus
 Desmidophorus hebes
 Desmidophorus helleri
 Desmidophorus hovanus
 Desmidophorus hubenthali
 Desmidophorus imhoffi
 Desmidophorus imhoffii
 Desmidophorus inexpertus
 Desmidophorus infernalis
 Desmidophorus kolbei
 Desmidophorus lacordairei
 Desmidophorus lanosus
 Desmidophorus luteipes
 Desmidophorus luteovestis
 Desmidophorus maculatus
 Desmidophorus maculicollis
 Desmidophorus morphosus
 Desmidophorus nobilis
 Desmidophorus obliquefasciatus
 Desmidophorus obtusatus
 Desmidophorus omissus
 Desmidophorus penicillatus
 Desmidophorus pictipennis
 Desmidophorus planidorsum
 Desmidophorus praetor
 Desmidophorus praeustus
 Desmidophorus probus
 Desmidophorus propinquus
 Desmidophorus pustulosus
 Desmidophorus rousiographus
 Desmidophorus rufovellus
 Desmidophorus saravacanus
 Desmidophorus satanas
 Desmidophorus schenklingi
 Desmidophorus senex
 Desmidophorus similis
 Desmidophorus strenuus
 Desmidophorus suavis
 Desmidophorus szetschuanus
 Desmidophorus transversalis
 Desmidophorus ursus
 Desmidophorus viduus
 Desmidophorus vinosus

References

 Bisby F.A., Roskov Y.R., Orrell T.M., Nicolson D., Paglinawan L.E., Bailly N., Kirk P.M., Bourgoin T., Baillargeon G., Ouvrard D. (red.) (2011).  Catalogue of Life
 Biolib

Weevil genera
Brachyceridae